Vallada Agordina (Ladin: Valada) is a comune (municipality) in the Province of Belluno in the Italian region Veneto, located about  northwest of Venice and about  northwest of Belluno.

Vallada Agordina borders the following municipalities: Canale d'Agordo, Cencenighe Agordino, Rocca Pietore, San Tomaso Agordino.

The church of San Simon has a fresco cycle by Paris Bordone (1549).

Twin towns
Vallada Agordina is twinned with:

  Massaranduba, Santa Catarina, Brazil, since 2011

References

Cities and towns in Veneto